L'enfant prodigue (The Prodigal Son) is a grand opera in five acts composed by Daniel Auber to a French libretto by Eugène Scribe based on the Parable of the Prodigal Son in Chapter 15 of the Gospel of Luke. It was first performed at the Théâtre de l'Académie Nationale de Musique in Paris on 6 December 1850. The role of Azaël (the prodigal son of the title) was sung in the premiere by the celebrated French tenor, Gustave-Hippolyte Roger, (1815-1879).

A stage production, "Azael, the prodigal : a grand romantic spectacle, in three acts" using excerpts from the opera, selected and arranged by one Henri or Henry Laurent; Edward Fitzball, librettist; was first performed at the Theatre Royal, Drury Lane on 19 February 1851.

The ballet music was used by Constant Lambert in 1933 for the ballet Les Rendezvous with choreography by Frederick Ashton.

References

Sources

Charlton, David, The Cambridge Companion to Grand Opera, Cambridge University Press, 2003. 
Lacombe, Hervé, The Keys to French Opera in the Nineteenth Century, University of California Press, 2001. 

Operas
Grand operas
1850 operas
Operas by Daniel Auber
French-language operas
Opera world premieres at the Paris Opera
Operas based on the Bible